Trent College is a co-educational independent boarding and day school located in Long Eaton, Derbyshire between Nottingham and Derby. Founded in 1868 as a local ’middle class alternative’ to the more famous public schools, it is now a coeducational school and a member of the Headmasters' and Headmistresses' Conference.

It has over 1,000 pupils, including 760 pupils in the Senior School and 330 pupils in the Junior School (The Elms School).

On the 28 March 2014, the governors announced that Bill Penty would be taking over as Head from September 2014 onward.

History

The foundation of Trent College was proposed in 1868 by Francis Wright at a meeting of the Midland branch of the Clerical and Lay Association. His vision was to open a boarding school for "boys of the middle class" as a more affordable alternative to the public schools, and to counter the Anglo-Catholic leaning of the schools set up by the Woodard Trust. The foundation stone was laid by William Cavendish, 7th Duke of Devonshire. Today, the school still retains its ties with the Cavendish family through the Duke's descendant, Peregrine Cavendish, 12th Duke of Devonshire, who is president of the Board of Governors.

The school opened in April 1868 with 53 boys on roll, and, within four months, the number had risen to 118. By 1870, 225 boys were registered as pupils. The school’s initial success was hit by the outbreak of scarlet fever in 1873 and the death of its first Headmaster, Thomas Ford Fenn, in 1883. Francis Wright was actively involved with the school until his death in 1873. In 1875, a school chapel was opened in his memory.

In 1975, the school welcomed its first girls into Sixth Form following the trend set by many previously single-sex independent schools. It became fully coeducational in 1992.

Buildings and facilities
The Warner Library was built by pupils in 1929 and contained about 6500 books, fiction, non-fiction and reference materials. The Obolensky, a modern lunch hall/meeting place, was opened in February 2008 and is named after Russian Prince Alexander Obolensky, a former pupil of Trent College. A new library (a conversion of the former dining hall conserving original wood panelling) was opened in 2010 and is named 'The Duke of Devonshire Library' after the school's president. The former Warner Library was converted into a Computer Science lab in 2016.

The Chapel
The foundation stone of the Chapel was laid after the death of Francis Wright. The building, which cost £300 and was designed by a Mr Robinson of Derby, has been re-modelled three times: first in 1949 by Sir Albert Richardson, president of the Royal Academy; the chancel was redesigned after a new organ was installed in 1976; and finally, in 2001, the pews and lighting were replaced. The west door curtain was a part of the interior of Westminster Abbey at the coronation of Queen Elizabeth II. The wooden collection plates are carved from olive wood from the Garden of Gethsemane outside Jerusalem, where Jesus Christ was arrested before his crucifixion. These were a bequest from the Broadhurst family.

As an Anglican school, pupils are required to attend chapel services throughout the week. In addition, boarders are required to attend Sunday services as well.

Pastoral Care

Houses
The Trent College House system incorporates all pupils, from Year 7 right through to Year 13. Each student is allocated into one of the 5 houses which can be identified either through the colour of House ties or badges. The houses are named after prominent figures in the history of Trent college.

Tutors
Normally pupils have the same tutor in their first year (Year 7); a new tutor for their four years in Senior School and another tutor for their two years in Sixth Form. In summer 2010 the pastoral care programme was rated as 'Excellent' for Pastoral Care and 'Excellent' for Pupils Personal Development by the Independent Schools Inspectorate.

Boarding
Trent has been a boarding school since its foundation and welcomes pupils aged 11 and above. Each boarding house is run by a Head of House and assisted by prefects. The houses can accommodate between 30 and 54 students in single or double study bedrooms. Pupils are not required to board and most boarders generally return home for the weekend.

There are four boarding houses at Trent – two houses which have boarders from ages 11–18 (Shuker for boys & Bates for girls), one girls Sixth Form only (Martin) and one boys boarding house from years 11-13 (Blake). The houses are named after prominent figures in the history of Trent college.

Co-Curricular

Music
Every year the school hosts a number of concerts which feature its music groups. Many of its students are members of ensembles outside of school, such as The Nottingham Youth Orchestra and The National Children's Orchestra. The main musical event is the Spring Concert which is held at the Albert Hall annually.

Sport
Trent has a strong sporting tradition, and its athletes often compete at county and national level. The school has produced a number of successful athletes who have represented England at international level.

On 29 March 2014, the Rugby 1st XV won the Natwest Cup Vase, beating Queen Elizabeth's Hospital Bristol in the Semi-Final and Exeter College in the Final.

Notable alumni
Former pupils are known as "Old Tridents" and are entitled membership of the Old Tridents' Society.

Reginald Philip Abigail, District Commissioner of Arakan during the fall of Burma in 1942
Rex Alston, Cricket commentator
Albert Ball VC MC, English World War I fighter pilot and flying ace
John Birch, former Master of the Choristers at Chichester Cathedral
Sir Howard Colvin, architectural historian
Harry Daft (1866 – 1945), England footballer
Thomas Fitton, cricketer and Royal Air Force officer
David Gillmore, Baron Gillmore of Thamesfield
Georgia Groome, actress
Simon Hopkinson, cook and author
Reverend Kenneth Hunt, England footballer and Olympic gold medallist
Holly Kenyon, actress
Clopton Lloyd-Jones, scorer of only goal of 1880 FA Cup Final
Vivian MacKerrell, actor
Alexander Obolensky, Russian prince and rugby international
Lieutenant-Colonel Richard Parsons, Army marksman
Kukrit Pramoj, thirteenth Prime Minister of Thailand
Seni Pramoj, three times Prime Minister of Thailand
Geoffrey Whitehead, actor
George Edward Ffrench  (1899-1918) World War I fighter pilot

Staff
Simon Hodgkinson, former England international rugby player
Abraham Shuker, cricketer and founder of the Trent Association (now called the Old Tridents' Association)

See also
Listed buildings in Long Eaton

References

External links
Trent College
Profile on the ISC website
ISI Inspection Reports - The Elms School (Junior section) & Senior School

Private schools in Derbyshire
Boarding schools in Derbyshire
Long Eaton
Co-educational boarding schools
Member schools of the Headmasters' and Headmistresses' Conference
Educational institutions established in 1868
 
1868 establishments in England